Bayterek (Báıterek), previously Novoalekseevka, 
is a small town in Almaty Region, in south-eastern Kazakhstan. Population 4731 (1979).

References

Populated places in Almaty Region